Rabbittown is a neighbourhood in St. John's, Newfoundland and Labrador. It is located near downtown, and is bounded approximately by Empire Avenue, Freshwater Road and Newtown Road.

History
Rabbittown was first developed in the years between World War I and World War II. Many of the street names correspond to locations where the Newfoundland Regiment fought or was stationed during World War I.  Merrymeeting Road is the primary traffic and commercial street.

Boundaries
Rabbittown exists primarily on the North ("outer") side of Merrymeeting Road, which was one of the early official boundaries of the City of St. John's.  The neighbourhood is home to many students; the neighbourhood is within walking distance of Memorial University of Newfoundland, and contains many relatively low-rent apartments.

Community

Rabbittown is generally a residential area. The area's primary commercial enterprises are two grocery stores (Coleman's and Sobey's), as well as two barber shops and several independent, short-order restaurants. The area is also served by two convenience stores, a drugstore and one gas station.

The Rabbittown Community Centre, which is located at 26 Graves Street, hosts a number of services for different age groups. There is a teen program, an afterschool program, an adults' Rabbittown Community Association neighborhood group. Also on-site are an Employment counselor, a CAP site and a nurse. 

The Rabbittown Theatre Company (who work from a facility of the same name) is a successful small theatre company located in the area, at the corner of Merrymeeting Road and Linscott Street.  The Theatre (with its Company) are the only institutions other than the community centre to formally bear the name of the neighbourhood.

The Hub, which refers to itself as "The Physically Disabled Service Centre" is on Merrymeeting Road, in the heart of the neighbourhood.

The neighbourhood was the setting of Rabbittown, a CBC Television comedy pilot which aired as a special in 2006 but was not picked up to series.

Religion
The Seventh-day Adventist Church has both a strong history and a current presence in the neighbourhood, with its only St. John's church located on Aldershot Street.  The original Adventist manse was at 106 Freshwater Road. That building was eventually replaced with a three-story Adventist Academy (high school) and an Adventist elementary school at 154 Freshwater.  When public funding for religious schools was cut in 1997, the two schools were consolidated, and the only Adventist school in the province, St. John's Adventist Academy, is now located at the site of the old elementary school.  Due to lack of funding, the school has not operated since 2003, but plans are reported to be in the works to consolidate church and school buildings and reopen the school. The old high school building is now the home of the Rabbittown Theatre Company.

Streets in Rabbittown
(arranged west to east)

Empire Avenue
Graves Street
Little Street
Winchester Street
Freshwater Road
Liverpool Avenue
Monchy Street
Hamel Street
Suez Street
Suvla Street
Cairo Street
Salisbury Street

Malta Street
Aldershot Street
Goodridge Street
Rankin Street
Hennebury Place
Calver Avenue
Merrymeeting Road
Edinburgh Street
McNeil Street
Summer Street
Mayor Avenue
Newtown Road
Linscott Street

Blatch Avenue
Avalon Street
Howley Avenue Extension
Calver Street
Scott Street
St. George's Court
Cook Street
Feild Street
Spencer Street

See also
Neighbourhoods in St. John's, Newfoundland and Labrador

External links
Rabbittown Community Centre

Neighbourhoods in St. John's, Newfoundland and Labrador
History of St. John's, Newfoundland and Labrador